Patrick Daley Thompson (born July 8, 1969) is an American former politician and convicted felon who most recently served as an alderman from Chicago's 11th ward and was previously a commissioner of the Metropolitan Water Reclamation District of Greater Chicago. A member of the prominent Daley family, he is a grandson of Richard J. Daley and a nephew of Richard M. Daley, both of whom served as longtime mayors of Chicago.

Early life
The son of Patricia (née Daley), a schoolteacher, and Bill Thompson, a real estate developer, following his parents' divorce, Patrick and his siblings moved to Bridgeport with their mother to be closer to her family.

Water Reclamation District Board of Commissioners
In 2012, Daley successfully ran for a position on the Metropolitan Water Reclamation District of Greater Chicago Board of Commissioners. His campaign received sizable fundraising, and endorsements from high-profile politicians, including Michael Madigan, Rahm Emanuel, Edward M. Burke, Toni Preckwinkle, and John P. Daley, as well as the endorsement of the Cook County Democratic Party.

Aldermanic career
Thompson, who succeeded long-time alderman James Balcer, was elected to office in a runoff election against John Kozlar in April 2015 and sworn in on May 18, 2015. The 11th ward encompasses several neighborhoods on Chicago's South Side, including Bridgeport, where Thompson was raised and currently resides.

Thompson was reelected in 2019. In the runoff of the 2019 Chicago mayoral election, Daley Thompson endorsed Toni Preckwinkle.

Conviction 
On April 29, 2021, Thompson was indicted on federal charges related to the investigation into the collapse of Washington Federal Bank for Savings. He was charged with two counts of making false statements to the FDIC and five counts of filing false income-tax returns. On February 14, 2022, Thompson was convicted on all charges. According to Illinois law, Thompson's federal conviction makes him ineligible to continue serving as the 11th Ward alderman and bans him from running for public office in the future.

On July 6, 2022, Thompson was sentenced to four months in prison for these charges. He began serving his sentence in August 2022 at a medium-security prison in Oxford, Wisconsin.

References 

1969 births
21st-century American politicians
Chicago City Council members
Daley family
Living people
Politicians from Chicago
John Marshall Law School (Chicago) alumni
Saint Mary's University of Minnesota alumni
Illinois politicians convicted of crimes